Martos is a Spanish, Hungarian or Ukrainian surname that may refer to
Antonio Martos (cyclist) (born 1946), Spanish racing cyclist
Antonio Martos Ortiz (born 1981), Spanish singer
Borys Martos (1879–1977), Ukrainian politician, pedagogue and economist
Cristino Martos y Balbí (1830–1893), Spanish politician and lawyer
Francisco Martos (born 1984), Spanish football player 
György Martos (born 1943), Hungarian speed skater 
Győző Martos (born 1949), Hungarian football player 
Ivan Martos (1754–1835), Russian-Ukrainian sculptor and art teacher
Iván Martos (born 1997), Spanish football player
Javi Martos (born 1984). Spanish football player
Juan Martos (born 1939), Spanish basketball player
Mario Martos (born 1991), Spanish football player 
Marco Martos (disambiguation)
Mihály Martos (born 1945), Hungarian speed skater
Rafael Manzano Martos (born 1936), Spanish architect
Sebastián Martos (born 1989), Spanish runner
Walter Martos (born 1957), Peruvian military general and politician

See also
Marto

Spanish-language surnames
Hungarian-language surnames